Pınar Tartan (born 26 March 1997) is a Turkish beauty pageant titleholder who won Miss Turkey Universe 2017 and represented Turkey at the Miss Universe 2017 pageant.

In December 2018, she was elected Miss Model of the World.

References

External links
Official Miss Turkey website

Miss Universe 2017 contestants
Living people
1997 births